The islands of the Indian Ocean are part of either the eastern, western, or southern areas. Some prominently large islands include Madagascar, Sri Lanka, and the Indonesian islands of Sumatra and Java.

Eastern Indian Ocean
Andaman Islands (India) 
Ashmore and Cartier Islands (Australia)
Buccaneer Archipelago (Australia)
Bird Island (Australia)
Carnac Island (Australia)
Christmas Island (Australia)
Cocos (Keeling) Islands (Australia)
Dirk Hartog Island (Australia)
Enggano Island (Indonesia)
Garden Island (Australia)
Houtman Abrolhos (Australia)
Lakshadweep Islands (India)
Langkawi Islands (Malaysia)
Little Island (Australia)
Mannar Island (Sri Lanka)
Mentawai Islands (Indonesia)
Mergui Archipelago (Myanmar)
Nias Island (Indonesia)
Nicobar Islands (India)
Pamban Island (India)
Penang Island (Malaysia)
Penguin Island (Australia)
Phi Phi Islands (Thailand)
Phuket (Thailand)
Rosemary Island (Australia)
Rottnest Island (Australia)
Sabang (Indonesia)
Sri Lanka
Seal Island (Encounter Bay) (Australia)
Seal Island (Investigator Strait), (Australia)
Shag Island (Australia)
Simeulue Island (Indonesia)
St. Mary's Islands (India)
Trigg Island (Australia)

Western Indian Ocean
Bajuni Islands (Somalia)
Bazaruto Archipelago (Mozambique)
Chagos Archipelago (including Diego Garcia) (UK)
Comoros
Khuriya Muriya Islands (Oman)
Lakshadweep Archipelago (India)
Lamu Archipelago (Kenya)
Madagascar
Mafia Island (Tanzania)
Maldives
Mauritius
Agaléga Islands
Cargados Carajos (St. Brandon)
Rodrigues
Mayotte (France)
Pemba (Tanzania)
Quirimbas Archipelago (Mozambique)
Réunion (France)
Seychelles
La Digue Island
Mahé, Seychelles
Praslin Island
Silhouette Island
Saad ad-Din Islands (Somalia)
Scattered Islands in the Indian Ocean (France)
Banc du Geyser
Bassas da India
Europa Island
Glorioso Islands
Juan de Nova Island
Tromelin Island
Socotra Island (Yemen)
Vypin Island (India)
Vamizi Island (Mozambique)
Vallarpadam (India)
Willingdon Island (India)
Zanzibar (Tanzania)

Southern Indian Ocean
Heard Island and McDonald Islands (Australia)
Île Amsterdam, home to the research station Martin-de-Viviès (France)
Île Saint-Paul (France)
Kerguelen Islands (France)
Prince Edward Islands (South Africa)
Marion Island
Prince Edward Island

See also
 List of islands of Antarctica and the Southern Ocean — on the south.
 List of islands in the Atlantic Ocean — on the southwest.
 List of islands in the Pacific Ocean — on the east.
 Lists of islands

 01
Indian Ocean
Indian Ocean